The  is a commuter electric multiple unit operated by Nagoya Railroad (Meitetsu) on the Meitetsu Komaki Line and inter-running services through the Nagoya Subway Kamiiida Line in Japan since 2002. They operate alongside the Nagoya Municipal Subway 7000 series introduced in 2003.

Formation
The trainsets are formed as follows. (Left is toward Heian-dōri Station and right is toward Inuyama Station)

The M1 and M2 cars are each fitted with one single-arm pantograph.

History 
The first cars were delivered in 2002, entering service from April 2002.

References

External links
 
 Meitetsu's description of the 300 series 
 Manufacturer's description of the 300 series 

Electric multiple units of Japan
Nippon Sharyo multiple units
300 series
Train-related introductions in 2002
1500 V DC multiple units of Japan